Phoxinus steindachneri is a species of freshwater fish in the family Cyprinidae. It is found in northeastern Asia.

References

Phoxinus
Taxa named by Henri Émile Sauvage
Fish described in 1883